The Geschriebenstein, less commonly called the Írott-kő in English sources, is a mountain, 884 metres high, located on the border between Austria and Hungary. It is the highest mountain of the Kőszeg Mountains, the highest point in western Hungary (Transdanubia) and highest point in Burgenland. Its height is 884 m according to Austrian sources, whereas Hungarian references mostly mention 883 m.

Its former Hungarian names were Fenyőhegy and Szálkő. Its present name (Írottkő in Hungarian, Geschriebenstein in English and German) can be translated as written stone and is assumably derived from border stones with inscriptions between the properties of the Batthyány and Esterházy families. On the summit, there is an observation tower built in 1913. This stands exactly on the border between Austria and Hungary.

Since December 2007 the Austrian–Hungarian border can be crossed without formalities, because Hungary has joined the Schengen Agreement.

The closest towns on the Austrian side are Rechnitz and Lockenhaus. On the Hungarian side the closest municipality is Velem and the closest town is Kőszeg.

References

External links 
Naturpark Geschriebenstein-Írottkő
Írottkő Nature Park Information Centre 
 Awarded "EDEN - European Destinations of Excellence" non traditional tourist destination 2009

Mountains of Hungary
Mountains of Lower Austria
Tourist attractions in Hungary
Tourist attractions in Burgenland
Mountains of Burgenland
Prealps East of the Mur
Mountains of the Alps
Mountains under 1000 metres